New Hampshire Route 63 is a  north–south state highway in Cheshire County in southwestern New Hampshire. It runs from Winchester to Westmoreland. The southern terminus is in Winchester at the Massachusetts state line, where the road continues as Massachusetts Route 63 in the town of Northfield. The northern terminus of NH 63 is in Westmoreland at New Hampshire Route 12.

Route description 

After entering Winchester from Massachusetts, NH 63 immediately enters the town of Hinsdale after only a few feet of pavement. Following the narrow salient of Hinsdale between the Connecticut River and Winchester, it is known locally as Northfield Road. Crossing the Ashuelot River into the main village of Hinsdale, it has a T-intersection with Main Street and joins NH 119 for a short concurrency eastward. At the intersection of Main Street, Canal Street, and Chesterfield Road, NH 63 turns north onto Chesterfield Road while NH 119 continues east on Canal Street,  Following Chesterfield Road north along the banks of Kilburn Brook, the road travels along the western edge of Pisgah State Park and enters the town of Chesterfield. At Spofford Lake, NH 63 intersects NH 9 (Franklin Pierce Highway) before passing north out of Chesterfield into Westmoreland. In the main village of Westmoreland, the road takes a hard turn to the northwest, then as it approaches the Connecticut River turns gradually back to the northeast in the village of Park Hill before coming to its northern terminus at NH 12.

Major intersections

References

External links

 New Hampshire State Route 63 on Flickr

063
Transportation in Cheshire County, New Hampshire